The Border Raiders is a 1918 American silent Western film directed by Stuart Paton and starring Betty Compson and George Larkin. It was shot on the Hopi Reservation in Arizona.

Plot
As described in a film magazine, Mock Sing (Deshon) runs a gambling den along the Mexico–United States border on the Rio Grande. It is the headquarters for a gang of cattle rustlers and opium smugglers. John Hardy (Carpenter), a millionaire rancher, makes the acquaintance of an adventuress connected to Mock Sing's place and the gang of crooks plans to gain possession of the Hardy properties. The adventuress marries Hardy and goes home with him, where she meets his daughter Rose (Compson). The gang captures Hardy and takes him to Mock Sing's house. Rose, learning of her father's predicament, goes to the gambling den to rescue him and is saved from Sing by the faro dealer, who proves to be a federal agent working to get evidence against the gang. Mock Sing is killed and the gang members are arrested by the Texas Rangers.

Cast
 Betty Compson as Rose Hardy
 George Larkin as John Smith
 Frank Deshon as Mock Sing
 H. C. Carpenter as John Hardy
 Claire Du Brey as Cleo Dade
 Howard Crampton as Emanuel Riggs
 Fred M. Malatesta as "Square Deal" Dixon

Reception
The film premiered at the Jewel Theater in Hamilton, Ontario. Like many American films of the time, The Border Raiders was subject to cuts by city and state film censorship boards. For example, the Chicago Board of Censors required a cut, in Reel 3, scene with shooting during a fight, slugging of Chinese man after he is pulled from horse, Reel 4, Chinese man suggestively leering at young woman on couch, two closeups of man with rope around neck, Reel 5, Chinese man tying young woman, and three shooting scenes where men fall.

Preservation
Archives Du Film Du CNC, Bois d'Arcy, has a print of the film.

References

External links
 
 
 Lantern slide

1918 films
Films directed by Stuart Paton
1918 Western (genre) films
American black-and-white films
Silent American Western (genre) films
Films shot in Arizona
Films set in Texas
1910s American films
1910s English-language films